The 2022 Army Black Knights men's lacrosse team represent the United States Military Academy in the 2022 NCAA Division I men's lacrosse season. The Black Knights are led by seventeenth-year head coach Joe Alberici and play their home games at Michie Stadium in West Point, New York. Army competes as a member of the Patriot League.

Previous season
The Black Knights finished the 2021 season 7–4 overall, 5–2 in the Patriot League, losing in the conference semifinal to Loyola and failing to make the NCAA tournament.

Preseason

Preseason poll
The Patriot League released their preseason poll on January 31, 2022 (voting was by conference head coaches and sports information directors). The Black Knights were picked to finish in third place and garnered two first-place votes.

Preseason All-Patriot League team
The Black Knights had four players picked to the preseason All-Patriot League team, placing the second-most in the conference. Additionally, three Black Knights garnered major award accolades: senior attack Brendan Nichtern was selected as the 2022 Patriot League Men's Lacrosse Preseason Offensive Player of the Year, senior defender Marcus Hudgins was selected as the 2022 Patriot League Men's Lacrosse Preseason Defensive Player of the Year, and senior goalie Wyatt Schupler was selected as the 2022 Patriot League Men's Lacrosse Preseason Goalkeeper of the Year.

Bobby Abshire, Senior, Midfielder
Marcus Hudgins, Senior, Defense
Brendan Nichtern, Senior, Attack
Wyatt Schupler, Senior, Goalie

Roster

Standings

Schedule

Schedule Source:

Rankings

References

Army Black Knights men's lacrosse players
Army Black Knights men's lacrosse team
Army Black Knights lacrosse